Sobasina platypoda is a jumping spider.

Name
platypoda "flat-footed" is based on the flattened dorsum of tibia 1 in both sexes.

Appearance
In contrast to other Sobasina species, in this one both sexes are quite similar. In males, however, the first legs are longer, in females the fourth. S. platypoda could at first be confused with Efate raptor.

Distribution
Sobasina platypoda is only known from Viti Levu and Ovalau islands of Fiji.

References
  (1998): Salticidae of the Pacific Islands. III.  Distribution of Seven Genera, with Description of Nineteen New Species and Two New Genera. Journal of Arachnology  26(2): 149-189. PDF

Salticidae
Endemic fauna of Fiji
Spiders of Fiji
Spiders described in 1998